The detrusor muscle, also detrusor urinae muscle, muscularis propria of the urinary bladder and (less precise) muscularis propria, is smooth muscle found in the wall of the bladder. The detrusor muscle remains relaxed to allow the bladder to store urine, and contracts during urination to release urine. Related are the urethral sphincter muscles which envelop the urethra to control the flow of urine when they contract.

Structure
The fibers of the detrusor muscle arise from the posterior surface of the body of the pubis in both sexes (musculi pubovesicales), and in the male from the adjacent part of the prostate. These fibers pass, in a more or less longitudinal manner, up the inferior surface of the bladder, over its apex, and then descend along its fundus to become attached to the prostate in the male, and to the front of the vagina in the female. At the sides of the bladder the fibers are arranged obliquely and intersect one another.

The three layers of muscles are arranged longitudinal-circular-longitudinal from innermost to outermost.

Function
During urination, the detrusor muscle is contracted via parasympathetic branches from the pelvic splanchnic nerves to empty the bladder. At other times, the muscle is kept relaxed via sympathetic branches from the inferior hypogastric plexus to allow the bladder to fill.

Clinical significance 
In older adults over 60 years in age, the detrusor muscle may cause issues in voiding the bladder, resulting in uncomfortable urinary retention.

The mucosa of the urinary bladder may herniate through the detrusor muscle. This is most often an acquired condition due to high pressure in the urinary bladder, damage, or existing connective tissue disorders.

See also
 External sphincter muscle of female urethra
 External sphincter muscle of male urethra
 Internal urethral sphincter

References

External links
 
 Detrusor myectomy for detrusor overactivity: 1-year follow-up

Urinary system
Muscles of the torso